The 2007 ICC World Cricket League Division Two is a tournament that forms part of the ICC World Cricket League. It was played in Windhoek, Namibia, between 24 November and 1 December 2007, and forms part of the qualification structure for the 2011 Cricket World Cup.

Teams

 (Promoted after winning 2007 ICC World Cricket League Division Three)
 (Promoted after second place in 2007 ICC World Cricket League Division Three)

The top four teams from this tournament progressed to the 2009 ICC World Cup Qualifier, which was played in the United Arab Emirates in April 2009. The 5th and 6th placed teams played in Division Three of the World Cricket League in early 2009.

Squads

Group stage

Points table

Fixtures and results

Final and playoffs

Final placings

Statistics

See also

ICC World Cricket League

References
World Cricket League structure

External links
 ICC World Cricket League Division 2 - Official Site (ICC)
 ICC World Cricket League Division 2 (Cricinfo)
 ICC World Cricket League Division 2 (CricketEurope)
 Player Profiles (Cricinfo)

International cricket competitions in 2007
2007, 2
International cricket competitions in Namibia
Sport in Windhoek
Cri
21st century in Windhoek